Olga Lewicka (born 1975) is a visual artist. Polish born, she lives and works in Berlin. Her practice focuses on painting, but it also encompasses installation, collage, performance, text and artist book.

Biography
Olga Lewicka studied at the Art Academy in Wrocław. In 2005 she won the Eugeniusz-Geppert-Competition and was awarded the price for young Polish painting.  In 2007 she was nominated for Views – The Deutsche Bank Foundation Award for the most interesting young artists on the Polish art scene. In 2010 she was awarded the “Młoda Polska” Polish Ministry of Culture and National Heritage scholarship for young artists.
 
Between 1997 and 2002 she also studied philosophy and literature at Wrocław University, New York University and Europa-Universität Viadrina. In 2003 she completed a doctoral thesis on aporia in art discourses, which was published by Wilhelm Fink Verlag in 2004, under the title “Pollock. Verflechtung des Sichtbaren und des Lesbaren” (Engl. “Pollock. The Intertwining of the Visible and the Readable”).

In her work Olga Lewicka deals with the status of the image and the art work in contemporary society. In research and project based works she mostly deals with painting, examining its possibilities and understanding it as a political argument rather than representation or illustration.

In examining painting, with all its options and reservations caused by its long history, she interrogates and plays off the forces of differences and shifts, to eventually initiate emancipatory visual processes.

Selected exhibitions

Solo 
2012 The New Summits. Mapping a Prospective All-Embracing Structure #1 at Wroclaw Contemporary Museum
2012 Mapping a Prospective All-Embracing Structure #2 at Verein zur Förderung für Kunst und Kultur am Rosa-Luxemburg-Platz, Berlin
2011 Panorama at Galeria Entropia, Wroclaw
2009 There ain't no second chance against the thing with forty eyes at lokal_30, Warsaw
2005 Showdown at Center for Contemporary Art Ujazdowski Castle, Warsaw

Group 
2012  The Happy Fainting of Painting at Zwinger Galerie, Berlin, curated by Gunter Reski and Hans-Jürgen Hafner
2011 Love for the Real Thing at Arsenal Municipal Gallery, Poznan, curated by Anna Czaban
2010 Diagram – to Jerzy Ludwiński at Galeria Działań, Warsaw, curated by Grzegorz Borkowski and Fredo Ojda
2009 How Does Painting Shape New Spaces at Inspiracje Art Festival, Szczecin
2008 104. Common Words at Sparwasser HQ, Berlin
2007 Views 2007 – The Deutsche Bank Foundation Award, Zachęta National Gallery of Art, Warsaw 
2004 gegenwärtig: Selbst, inszeniert, Hamburger Kunsthalle, Hamburg, curated by Matthias Mühling

Selected publications and lectures 
2011 PANORAMA. Materials for Mapping a Prospective All-Embracing Structure. Artist book. Poznań: Morava Publishing House
2010 Wie Polens Königsweg nun zum Irrweg wird. from 24 April 2010 and Der Standard from 22 April 
2007 Samson, or Contemporary Art. Obieg, Centre for Contemporary Art Ujazdowski Castle, no 1&2/2007
2007 AURORA. Zwischen Nacht und Tag. Ein Ausstellungs- und Buchprojekt zwischen Berlin und Wrocław in zwei Teilen. Artist book. Wrocław: BWA Awangarda 
2007 Aurora. Utopie und Surréflexion. In: S. Diekmann/T. Khurana, Latenz. Berlin: Kulturverlag Kadmos
2006 An den Grenzen der Repräsentation. In: V. Beyer/A. Haverkamp/J. Voorhoeve, Das Bild ist der König. Repräsentation nach Louis Marin. München: Wilhelm Fink
2005 Drip´n´Draw - Entwurf und Konzept bei Jackson Pollock. Lecture at Deutsche Guggenheim Berlin
2005 Pollock. Verflechtung des Sichtbaren und des Lesbaren. München: Wilhelm Fink

References

External links 
Olga Lewicka "There ain't no second chance...

1975 births
Living people
20th-century Polish painters
21st-century Polish painters
Polish women painters
20th-century Polish women artists
21st-century Polish women artists